Summerstrand is a seaside suburb of Port Elizabeth, South Africa. It is primarily a residential suburb along with shopping and business facilities. It is also home to three Nelson Mandela University campuses.

Geography 

Summerstrand lies on the Indian Ocean coastline between Humewood in the north and the Nelson Mandela Metro University Nature Reserve in the south.

The M4 passes through the town along the coast connecting to Port Elizabeth city centre in the north and Schoenmakerskop in the south. The M13 connects more of the inner suburban area of Summerstrand and links to Humewood in the north.

Demographics 
The population of Summerstrand is 12,614. Over half of the population are English-speaking Whites of British descent. 10.3% of people in Summerstrand are Xhosa people and 5.6% are Coloureds who speak Afrikaans as a first language. There are also White South Africans who speak Afrikaans as a first language and Indian South Africans as well.

Government and politics 
Summerstrand is located in the Nelson Mandela Bay Metropolitan Municipality which governs the city of Port Elizabeth, Despatch, Uitenhage and surroundings.

Education 

The southern part of Summerstrand is dominated by the Nelson Mandela University (NMU). Nelson Mandela University has its south (main) and North Campus  in the southern part with the 2nd Avenue Campus in the northern part.

Although the suburb is dominated by NMU, there are also other schools such as :
 Cape Recife High School 
 Dolfyntjie Pre-Primary School
 Pearson High School 
 Summerwood Primary School

Entertainment 

Summerstrand is home to the Broadwalk Casino and Entertainment World, the only casino in the Nelson Mandela Bay Metro. The casino also includes a hotel and is owned by Sun International.

There are many hotels in Summerstrand such as Road Lodge Port Elizabeth, Raddison Blu Port Elizabeth and Protea Hotel (by Marriot) Port Elizabeth Marine. There are also numerous guest houses and lodges in Summerstrand.

There is also the nearby Bayworld in Humewood, a museum complex comprising the Museum, oceanarium, Snake Park as well as Number 7 Castle Hill Museum. Summerstrand is also near the Cape Recife Nature Reserve.

Sport and Recreation 

There are also two beaches in Summerstrand, Hobie and Pollock Beach. Hobie Beach is a famous beach in Port Elizabeth and includes the Shark Rock Pier, the only pier in Nelson Mandela Bay. There is also the nearby the Kings Beach in Humewood which is Port Elizabeth's flagship beach.

Apart from the beaches there are also other sports and recreation facilities such as the Humewood Golf Club and the Summerstrand Tennis Club.

References 

Populated places in Nelson Mandela Bay
Port Elizabeth
Populated coastal places in South Africa